Andronik Arutyunovich Karagezyan (born 17 December 1974) is a former Russian professional football player.

Club career
He played in the Russian Football National League for FC Dynamo-SPb St. Petersburg in 2003.

External links
 

1974 births
Living people
People from Gulkevichsky District
Association football goalkeepers
Russian sportspeople of Armenian descent
Russian footballers
Russian expatriate footballers
Expatriate footballers in Ukraine
Russian expatriate sportspeople in Moldova
Expatriate footballers in Moldova
Expatriate footballers in Armenia
Armenian Premier League players
FC Pyunik players
FC Taganrog players
FC Slavyansk Slavyansk-na-Kubani players
FC Kuban Krasnodar players
FC Dynamo Saint Petersburg players
FC Lukhovitsy players
FC Spartak-UGP Anapa players
Sportspeople from Krasnodar Krai